Morrison Township is a township in Aitkin County, Minnesota, United States. The population was 200 as of the 2010 census.

History
Morrison Township was named for Edward Morrison, an early settler.

Geography

Major highways
  U.S. Highway 169
  Minnesota State Highway 210

Lakes
 Krilwitz Lake

Adjacent townships
 Waukenabo Township (north)
 Logan Township (northeast)
 Fleming Township (east)
 Spencer Township (south)
 Aitkin Township (southwest)

Cemeteries
The township contains Riverside Cemetery.

Demographics
As of the census of 2000, there were 186 people, 70 households, and 52 families residing in the township.  The population density was 5.2 people per square mile (2.0/km2).  There were 79 housing units at an average density of 2.2/sq mi (0.8/km2).  The racial makeup of the township was 97.31% White, 1.08% African American, 0.54% Native American, and 1.08% from two or more races. Hispanic or Latino of any race were 1.08% of the population.

There were 70 households, out of which 30.0% had children under the age of 18 living with them, 65.7% were married couples living together, 2.9% had a female householder with no husband present, and 24.3% were non-families. 20.0% of all households were made up of individuals, and 10.0% had someone living alone who was 65 years of age or older.  The average household size was 2.66 and the average family size was 3.04.

In the township the population was spread out, with 24.2% under the age of 18, 4.8% from 18 to 24, 28.0% from 25 to 44, 26.3% from 45 to 64, and 16.7% who were 65 years of age or older.  The median age was 43 years. For every 100 females, there were 97.9 males.  For every 100 females age 18 and over, there were 107.4 males.

The median income for a household in the township was $25,750, and the median income for a family was $27,500. Males had a median income of $31,875 versus $21,250 for females. The per capita income for the township was $13,984.  About 14.3% of families and 15.4% of the population were below the poverty line, including 28.9% of those under the age of eighteen and 6.7% of those 65 or over.

References
 United States National Atlas
 United States Census Bureau 2007 TIGER/Line Shapefiles
 United States Board on Geographic Names (GNIS)

Townships in Aitkin County, Minnesota
Townships in Minnesota